Live at Donington 1990 is a live album by English hard rock band Whitesnake. It was recorded at Castle Donington on 18 August 1990 during the Monsters of Rock festival, which the band headlined. It was released on 20 May 2011 in Japan, 3 June in Europe and 7 June in the US.

Background
The band was performing with a modern sound system during the tour, which ensured an impressive sound quality, and the concert was broadcast live by BBC Radio.  Widely bootlegged, fans requested the release of the footage of the concert through a mobilization on the group's website, as well as professional audio of the show. The album was released as a 2-CD set, a single DVD set, a 2CD/DVD digipack, vinyl and as a digital edition. A 30th-anniversary remastered edition of the album was released in August 2020.

Track listing

Disc 1

Disc 2

DVD

Personnel

Whitesnake
 David Coverdale – lead vocals
 Steve Vai – guitars, backing vocals
 Adrian Vandenberg – guitars, backing vocals
 Rudy Sarzo – bass, backing vocals
 Tommy Aldridge – drums, percussion
 Rick Seratte – keyboards, backing vocals

Charts

References 

2011 live albums
2011 video albums
Whitesnake live albums
Whitesnake video albums
Frontiers Records live albums
Frontiers Records video albums
Live heavy metal albums
Live hard rock albums